Les Belles de nuit (US title: Beauties of the Night) is a 1952 French language motion picture fantasy directed and written by René Clair who co-produced with Angelo Rizzoli. The film stars Gérard Philipe, Martine Carol,  Gina Lollobrigida and Magali Vendeuil. It was nominated the Venice Film Festival for Golden Lion (René Clair).

Plot
Impoverished piano teacher and composer Claude (Gérard Philipe) fantasizes about seducing beautiful rich women. One night a promising dream turns into a nightmare in which he's chased by the violent husbands and brothers of his lovers. He gets up and tries to stay awake for fear of feeling haunted again. Then he meets his neighbour Suzanne (Magali Vendeuil) who resembles a woman from his dream.

Cast
Gérard Philipe as Claude 
Martine Carol as  Edmee 
Gina Lollobrigida as Leila / Cashier 
Magali Vendeuil as  Suzanne 
Marilyn Buferd as Madame Bonacieux / Postal clerk 
Raymond Bussières as  Roger the mechanic 
Raymond Cordy as  Suzanne's father Gaston / Marquis 
Bernard La Jarrige as  Léon, le gendarme / Leon the gendarme 
Albert Michel as  Le facteur / Postman 
Palau as The Old Gentleman 
Jean Parédès as  Paul the pharmacist 
Paolo Stoppa as Opera director

References

External links

Les Belles de nuit at Films de France

Films directed by René Clair
French romantic fantasy films
1950s fantasy comedy films
1950s romantic fantasy films
Films about composers
Films about dreams
French fantasy comedy films
1950s French-language films
French black-and-white films
1950s French films